Ivan Nikolayevich Taranov (born 22 June 1986) is a Russian former football defender.

Club career
Spotted playing at a footballing school in Prokhladny, Taranov was spirited away to a boarding school by Black Sea side FC Chernomorets Novorossiysk where he spent two years learning his craft. After a season in the Novorossiysk side's reserve team in 2001 Taranov opted to move on to Moscow to join CSKA's reserves. Taranov represented his country at Under-19 level, making the step up to the U21 side with a substitute appearance against Luxembourg in October 2005. He made his Russian Premier League debut for CSKA on 23 October 2005 in a game against FC Amkar Perm. he played in CSKA's 2006 Russian Cup final victory against Spartak Moscow and has recently been featured in the first team more often.

He received first senior national team call-up against Republic of Macedonia in 2006, but did not play.

He made 3 appearances in UEFA Champions League 2006-07.

He made a late substitute appearance in FC Krasnodar's 2018–19 UEFA Europa League Round of 16 game against Valencia. On 23 December 2019, his contract with FC Krasnodar was terminated by mutual consent.

Career statistics

References

External links

Career summary at sportbox.ru  

1986 births
Sportspeople from Tomsk
Living people
Russian footballers
Russia under-21 international footballers
Russia national football B team footballers
PFC CSKA Moscow players
PFC Krylia Sovetov Samara players
Association football central defenders
Russian Premier League players
FC Krasnodar players
FC Chernomorets Novorossiysk players
FC Krasnodar-2 players